Noe Ramirez may refer to:

 Noé Ramirez (born 1989), American baseball player
 Noé Ramírez Mandujano, former Mexican anti-drug law enforcement chief